Sameodes pictalis is a moth in the family Crambidae first described by Charles Swinhoe in 1895. It is found in Assam, India.

References

Moths described in 1895
Spilomelinae